Charles Albert McCurdy (13 March 1870 – 10 November 1941) was a British Liberal Member of Parliament and minister in the Lloyd George Coalition Government. He was made a member of the Privy Council in 1920.

Background
McCurdy was educated at Loughborough Grammar School and Pembroke College, Cambridge.

Career
He then became a barrister. He was elected Member of Parliament for Northampton, then a two-member constituency, in 1910.  He was returned in 1918 when it was reduced to a single-member seat, his former Liberal co-member Hastings Lees-Smith having sought election elsewhere and joined the Labour Party.

Coalition government
He was Parliamentary Secretary to the Ministry of Food Control from 1919 to 1920 and then Minister of Food Control in 1920. After the Ministry of Food Control was abolished in April 1921, he was appointed Coalition Liberal Chief Whip (officially 'Parliamentary Secretary to the Treasury') in succession to Frederick Guest. Guest had held the position during the 1918 seat negotiations with the Unionists. Unlike Guest, McCurdy was more concerned with strengthening the Liberals part in the Coalition and took a much tougher line with the Unionists. A junior Unionist whip Robert Sanders, wrote in his diary that McCurdy was "a particularly bad-mannered fellow...the reverse...of Guest". McCurdy favoured a general election in January 1922 and the formation of a Centre Party made up of Liberals, moderate Conservatives and moderate Labour MPs. In March 1922, McCurdy wrote to Lloyd George claiming that one hundred Unionist MPs would defect if a Centre Party was formed. Lloyd George, however, decided to stay with the Coalition. He left office with Lloyd George when the Unionists ended the coalition in October 1922.

Liberal reunion
After the coalition ended, McCurdy favoured Liberal reunion. He was influential in drawing up the Liberals' manifesto for the 1923 general election, moving it further in a free trade direction.  However, he was not returned at that election.  He died in November 1941, aged 71, a month before his former co-member for Northampton, Hastings Lees-Smith.

McCurdy's niece, Margaret Wingfield, was an influential member of the Liberal Party, and eventually its President.

Electoral record

References

The Impact of Labour, 1920 - 1924 (Cambridge University Press, 1971) by Maurice Cowling.

External links 
 
 

1870 births
1941 deaths
Members of the Privy Council of the United Kingdom
Liberal Party (UK) MPs for English constituencies
People educated at Loughborough Grammar School
Alumni of Pembroke College, Cambridge
UK MPs 1910
UK MPs 1910–1918
UK MPs 1918–1922
UK MPs 1922–1923